The 2012–13 season is Hapoel Tel Aviv Football Club's 85th years in the Israeli Football.

Squad report
The team started the season with Nitzan Shirazi as coach.  After finishing at the 2nd place the previous Ligat Winner season, Hapoel Tel Aviv Playning on Europe League.

Transfers
The team so far signed Daniel Borcal, Roee Zachri, Hanan Maman, John Paintsil, Eric Djemba-Djemba, Bruno Coutinho, Eliran Danin, Zee'v Haimovich, Tal Ben-Haim,

Marko Suler, Mahran Lala and Bevan Fransman left the team from financial reasons. Omri Kanada was released from Hapoel Tel Aviv. Nosa Igiebor left for Real Betis.

Current squad
As of 15 September 2012.

Players out on loan

Foreigners 2012–13
Only up to five non-Israeli nationals can be in an Israeli club squad. Those with Jewish ancestry, married to an Israeli, or have played in Israel for an extended period of time, can claim a passport or permanent residency which would allow them to play with Israeli status.

   Apoula Edel
   Bruno Coutinho
   John Paintsil
   Eric Djemba-Djemba
   Nikola Petković

Non-playing staff

Coaching staff

Premier league

League table

Results by round

Matches

UEFA Europa League

Play-off round

Hapoel Tel Aviv won 7–1 on aggregate.

Group stage

Toto Cup

Group B

State Cup

See also
 2012–13 UEFA Europa League
 2012–13 Toto Cup Al

References

Hapoel Tel Aviv F.C. seasons
Hapoel Tel Aviv
Hapoel Tel Aviv
Hapoel Tel Aviv